Zairabul (also Romanized as Zāīrābūl) is a village in Kabgan Rural District, Kaki District, Dashti County, Bushehr Province, Iran. At the 2006 census, its population was 38, in 8 families.

References 

Populated places in Dashti County